Al Gorg or Algorg may refer to:
 Al Gorg, Hirmand, a village in Hirmand County, Sistan and Baluchestan Province, Iran
 Al Gorg, Zabol, a village in Sistan and Baluchestan Province, Iran

See also
 Gorg (disambiguation)